Castle Ashby is a village and civil parish in the West Northamptonshire district, in the ceremonial county of  Northamptonshire, England. Historically the village was set up to service the needs of Castle Ashby House, the seat of the Marquess of Northampton. The village has one small pub-hotel, The Falcon. At the time of the 2011 census, the parish's population (including Chadstone) was 111 people. The village contains many houses rebuilt from the 1860s onwards. These include work by the architect E.F. Law of Northampton, whose work can also be seen nearby at Horton Church. The castle is the result of a licence obtained in 1306, for Walter Langton, Bishop of Coventry, to castellate his mansion in the village of Ashby.

The villages name means 'Ash-tree farm/settlement'. There was a castle here, later replaced by the Elizabethan mansion.

See also
Compton Wynyates

Notes

Further reading

External links

Castle Ashby Cricket Club
1999 Oil Painting of Castle Ashby
Castle Ashby Gardens website

Villages in Northamptonshire
Compton family
West Northamptonshire District
Civil parishes in Northamptonshire